Eagoler Chokh (alternatively known as Goenda Shabor: Eagoler Chokh) is a 2016 Indian Bengali-language crime thriller film directed by Arindam Sil. It is the sequel to 2015 film Ebar Shabor and the second installment of Goenda Shabor film series. The film is based on a story of same name, written by Shirshendu Mukhopadhyay.

Synopsis
ACP Shabor Dasgupta (Saswata Chatterjee) and his assistant Nanda go on a hunt, searching for a young woman murderer. Trapped in a maze of lies and deceit, Dasgupta suspects the rich entrepreneur Bishan Roy (Anirban Bhattacharya) and three women connected to him. Each of them knew the murdered woman Nandini very well. As Dasgupta delves deep into the mystery, he ends up getting new insight into human psychology and in turn, solving complexities of his own mind.

Cast
 Saswata Chatterjee as Shabor Dasgupta 
 Subhrajit Dutta as Nanda (Shabor's assistant)
 Jaya Ahsan as Shivangi Roy
 Payel Sarkar as Nandini Sen
 Anirban Bhattacharya as Bishan Roy
 Gaurav Chakrabarty as sub-inspector Sanjib Das(Special appearance)
 Arunima Ghosh as Rita Fernandez
 Riya Banik  as Jahnabi
Joydeep Kundu
 June Malia as a Psychiatrist Madhurima Sen
 Ushoshi Sengupta as Shyamangi

Soundtrack

Critical reception
The film got mostly positive reviews from critics and audience. Sangbad Pratidin gave the film 4 stars out of 5. Anandalok magazine gave the film 4 out of 5 stars. Sulekha gave the film 3 out of 5 stars. Bookmyshow gave the film 4.5 out of 5. The Times of India gave the film 3.5 stars.

Awards and nominations

Sequel

After success of Eagoler Chokh a sequel has been confirmed by director Arindam Sil. In August 2017, the director told the media, the shooting of the third installment of Goenda Shabor franchise will start from 7 September 2017. The film has been titled Aschhe Abar Shabor, and will be based on the novel Prajapatir Mrityu O Punorjanmo by Shirshendu Mukhopadhyay. After completing its first schedule in West Bengal, the team will fly for Lucknow to shoot rest of the part. Saswata Chatterjee, Subhrajit Dutta and Gourav Chakrabarty returning for the sequel as their respective characters with Indraneil Sengupta, Anindya Chatterjee, Anjana Basu and Mir Afsar Ali with major characters. Shooting started from early September, for release in January 2018.

See also
 Aborto
 Ebar Shabor
 Har Har Byomkesh

References

External links
 

Indian detective films
Bengali-language Indian films
2010s Bengali-language films
Films scored by Bickram Ghosh
2010s crime drama films
Films based on works by Shirshendu Mukhopadhyay
Films directed by Arindam Sil